Stephen (or Étienne) III (died 1241) was Count of Auxonne. He was from the House of Ivrea, son of Stephen II, count of Auxonne (died after 1173) and Judith of Lorraine (c. 1140 – 1173). He was Stephen III in his House and Stephen II as count of Auxonne.

His father Stephen II of Auxonne was son of William III, count of Mâcon and his wife Poncette/Alice, lady of Traves. His mother Judith was daughter of  Matthias I, Duke of Lorraine and Bertha Hohenstaufen (daughter of Frederick II, Duke of Swabia).

Stephen III married firstly (c. 1186) to Beatrix, countess of Châlon (daughter of Guillaume, count of Chalon and Beatrix, a daughter of  Frederick Barbarossa, Holy Roman Emperor), but they divorced between 1197/1200. 

He married, secondly (before 1212), to Agnes of Dreux (1195–1258), daughter of Robert II, Count of Dreux by his second wife Yolande de Coucy.

Stephen had issue only from his first marriage to Beatrix, countess of Châlon:
 John I, count of Burgundy, Chalon and lord of Salins. He married three times. His great-granddaughter is Joan II, Countess of Burgundy, wife of Philip V of France.
 Agnes (died 1223); married to Richard III, lord de Montfaucon, son of Amadeus II of Montfaucon.
 Clementia (died after 1235); Married to Berthold V, Duke of Zähringen
 Beatrix (died 1260); married to Simon de Joinville and had issue: Geoffrey de Geneville, 1st Baron Geneville.

He had also an illegitimate child: Stephen (Etienne), baron d' Oiselet (1208 – after 1267).

References

Sources

External links

1241 deaths